is the second single by Japanese girl group Melon Kinenbi. It was used as the theme song of the internet information delivery service Tottoco. Its highest position on the Oricon weekly chart was #42.

Track listings

CD

External links
Kokuhaku Kinenbi at the Up-Front Works release list (Zetima) (Japanese)

2000 singles
Zetima Records singles
Song recordings produced by Tsunku
2000 songs